A sayadaw (and alternatively spelled hsayadaw, sayado, sayāḍo or sayāḍaw) is a Burmese Buddhist title used to reference the senior monk or abbot of a monastery. Some distinguished sayadaws would often be referred to as a sayadawgyi (as a sign of reverence. The terms "sayadaw" and "sayadawgyi" originally corresponded to the senior monks who taught the former Burmese kings.  These sayadaws may be influential teachers of Buddhism and also important meditation practitioners. They usually are abbots of monasteries or monastery networks with many resident monks and a lay following.

In Buddhism in Burma, several honorific terms exist for Buddhist monks, reflecting their achievements and how many vassas they have passed. The most frequently used terms, which are used as prefixes to the monks' Dhamma name, include:
"Bhaddanta"
"Ashin"
"Shin"
"U"
"Upazin"
"Sayadaw"
"Sayadawgyi"

A sayadaw may be known by his dharma name, a qualified name, or by the name of his monastery. Thus, venerable Mingun Sayadaw, who served as "Chief Respondent" at the Sixth Buddhist council in Yangon, could be addressed as:

 Mingun Sayadaw (in reference to his home monastery at Mingun)
 U Vicittasarabhivamsa
 Sayadaw U Vicittasarabhivamsa
 Mingun Sayadaw U Vicittasarabhivamsa
 Tipitaka Sayadaw U Vicittasarabhivamsa
 Tipitakadhara Dhammabhandakarika Sayadaw U Vicittasarabhivamsa, in reference to being the first monk to be awarded the titles "Bearer of the Tripiṭaka" and "Treasurer of the Dhamma"

List of prominent Sayadaws

The following is a list of some prominent sayadaws in recent Burmese history.

Shwe Nya War Sayadaw
Sayadaw U Tejaniya
Ledi Sayadaw
Mingun Sayadaw
Mahasi Sayadaw
Webu Sayadaw
Mogok Vimala
Chanmyay Sayadaw
Thamanya Sayadaw
Maha Bodhi Ta Htaung Sayadaw
Ashin Sandadika
Sitagu Sayadaw
U Pandita
Ashin Nandamalabhivamsa
Thi Lung Sayadaw

References

External links 
Buddhism Concepts - What is a Sayadaw?

Burmese Buddhist titles
Religious leadership roles